The PBA Season 46 draft (originally planned as the 2020 PBA rookie draft) was the 36th edition of the PBA draft. The league determined the drafting order based on the performance of the member teams from the 2020 season, with the team having the worst record picking first. For this draft, the PBA decided to forgo the seven-game requirement to play in the PBA Developmental League (D-League).

The Terrafirma Dyip held the right for the first overall pick of the draft.

Draft order
Since 2015, the draft order was determined based on the overall performance of the teams from the previous season. The Philippine Cup final ranking comprises 40% of the points, while the rankings of the Commissioner's and Governors' Cups are 30% each.

Since the league held only one tournament for the 2020 season, the final rankings of the Philippine Cup were used to determine the draft order.

Special draft
For the third time and second consecutively in PBA history, there was another separate draft for the players in the pool for the Philippine national team, locally known as Gilas Pilipinas. Four teams held the rights to the players they selected only after their release from international duty.

As a reiteration of the agreement between the PBA and the Samahang Basketbol ng Pilipinas, the latter named players to be loaned to the Philippines training camp after their selection in this special draft.

Draft selections

Special round

1st round

2nd round

3rd round

Barangay Ginebra passed during the round.

4th round

Alaska passed during the round.

5th round

Magnolia and Meralco passed during the round.

6th round

Rain or Shine, Phoenix, and TNT passed during the round.

7th round

Terrafirma, Blackwater, and NLEX passed during the round.

8th round

San Miguel passed during the round.

9th round
A ninth round was held, but NorthPort passed, thus ending the draft.

Trades involving draft picks

Pre-draft trades
Prior to the day of the draft, the following trades were made and resulted in exchanges of picks between the teams.

Draft picks per school

Notes

References

External links
 PBA.ph

2021
2020–21 in Philippine basketball
March 2021 sports events in the Philippines